Bruce Stewart (born 27 December 1939) was an Australian racing driver. He is best known for having the fifth most starts of any driver at the Bathurst 1000, however has often been overlooked as most starts occurred in the 'co-driver' role.

Results

Bathurst 1000 results

References

1939 births
Racing drivers from New South Wales
Living people
Australian Endurance Championship drivers
Nürburgring 24 Hours drivers